In historiography and genocide studies, cumulative radicalization is the notion that genocide and other mass crimes are not planned long in advance, but emerge from wartime crises and a process of radicalization. Originally coined by German historian Hans Mommsen with regard to the functionalist view of the Holocaust, in his 1976 essay "National Socialism: Cumulative Radicalization and the Regime’s Self-Destruction". The concept has also been applied to the Armenian genocide.

References

Further reading
 Bibliography of Genocide studies

Holocaust studies
Genocide studies
Radicalization